This is a list of official football games played by Iran national football team between 1941 and 1959.

1941
Friendly

1949
Friendly

1950
Friendly

Friendly

1951
1951 Asian Games – Quarterfinal

1951 Asian Games – Semifinal

1951 Asian Games – Semifinal (Replay)

1951 Asian Games – Final

1952
Friendly

1958
1958 Asian Games – Preliminary Round

1958 Asian Games – Preliminary Round

1959
1960 AFC Asian Cup Qualifier

1960 AFC Asian Cup Qualifier

1960 AFC Asian Cup Qualifier

1960 AFC Asian Cup Qualifier

1960 AFC Asian Cup Qualifier

1960 AFC Asian Cup Qualifier

Statistics

Results by year

Managers

Opponents

External links
 www.teammelli.com
 www.fifa.com

1940s in Iranian sport
1950
1950s in Iranian sport